John Maxim (20 July 1925 — 20 January 1990), sometimes credited as John Wills, was an English film and television actor.

Career
Between 1958 and 1988, he appeared in six films and nine television productions including the films The Frightened City (1961), She (1965), and Dracula: Prince of Darkness (1966). His television work included guest appearances in Ivanhoe, The Adventures of William Tell as Trooper Strauss in episode 24, "The Ensign" and Captain Markheim in episode 25, "The Unwelcome Stranger", as well as The Prisoner. He also appeared in two Doctor Who serials: The Chase as Frankenstein's monster and The Moonbase as a Cyberman (the latter credited as John Wills).

Filmography

Notes

External links

1925 births
1990 deaths
English male film actors
English male television actors
Male actors from Brighton
20th-century English male actors